Elizabeth Learning Center (formerly Elizabeth Street Elementary School) is a preK-12 public school in Cudahy, California, United States. It is part of the Los Angeles Unified School District. The high school (grades 9–12) contains two California Partnership Academies, the 'Health Academy', and 'InfoTech Academy'.

History
The school was originally built in the early 1900s as Elizabeth Street Elementary School. The school was named after Elizabeth Cudahy, daughter of the city's founder Pancho Cudahy.  Elizabeth Learning Center is currently a pre-K through 12th grade SPAN school, and is part of the Los Angeles Unified School District.

Athletics 
The school's athletic department consists of the following teams:
Baseball
Basketball
Cross Country
Soccer
Softball
Volleyball
Tennis

Clubs/Academic Teams/Associations
Academic Decathlon (competitive)
Debate Team (competitive)
HOSA
DECA (competitive) 
ELCAA (Elizabeth Learning Center Alumni Association)
Virtual Business
Robotics Club
Photography Club (The Click)
Bridge Club
Travel Club
Leadership

External links

References

Schools in Los Angeles County, California
Educational institutions established in the 1900s
1900s establishments in California